Graphic Storytelling and Visual Narrative is a 1996 book by American cartoonist Will Eisner that provides a formal overview of comics. It is a companion to his earlier book Comics and Sequential Art (1985).

Sources

See also
 Comics studies
 Sequential art

1996 non-fiction books
Books about comics
Books by Will Eisner